Orchids of the Philippines is a book by Jim Cootes which was the first to document all existing Filipino orchid species.

History 
Jim Cootes is an Australian orchid enthusiast who is the foremost expert on orchids of the Philippines. He did field work in the Philippines from 1997 and 2000 as part of his research for the book. The book is an important guide for researchers, orchid collectors and botanists in the field of endemic orchid species.

See also

References 

.
Philippines
Books about the Philippines
2001 non-fiction books
Botany in Asia